Looking Back is the seventh album released by John Mayall in August 1969 by Decca Records. The album features songs by both John Mayall's Bluesbreakers and John Mayall solo work. The album reached No. 79 on the Billboard 200. Confusingly, there are two different albums with the title "Looking Back": a Decca UK release as a single album (SKL 5010) and a Decca Germany (issued by TELDEC) release as a double album (DS 3104/1-2). Later issues on CD would use the Deram label.

Album description
The German Decca release was a double album, whilst the UK Decca release only featured Eric Clapton on one track. However, the German release did not have the title track in its track listing, and the songs are not as rare, with several songs ("Parchman Farm", "Double Crossing Time", "The Super-Natural", "Steppin' Out", "Ramblin' on my Mind", "The Death of J. B. Lenoir", "Checking Up on my Baby", and "I Can't Quit You Baby") already released on The Bluesbreakers' studio albums (Blues Breakers with Eric Clapton, A Hard Road, and Crusade).

Track listings

Decca UK release

Decca Germany release

Personnel

John Mayall – Lead vocals, piano, organ, guitar, harmonica

John Mayall & The Bluesbreakers
Bernie Watson – Guitar on "Mr. James"
Roger Dean – Guitar on "Blues City Shakedown"
Eric Clapton – Lead guitar on "Stormy Monday"
Peter Green – Lead guitar on tracks 4 to 8, 10, and steel guitar on "Picture on the Wall"
Mick Taylor – Lead guitar on "Suspicions (Part Two)"
John McVie – Bass guitar on tracks 1, 2, and 4 to 8.
Jack Bruce – Bass guitar on "Stormy Monday"
Paul Williams – Bass guitar on "Suspicions (Part Two)" 
Martin Hart – Drums on "Mr. James"
Hughie Flint – Drums on "Blues City Shakedown" and "Stormy Monday"
Aynsley Dunbar – Drums on "So Many Roads", Looking Back", and "Sitting in the Rain"
Mick Fleetwood – Drums on "It Hurts Me Too" and "Double Trouble"
Keef Hartley – Drums on "Suspicions (Part Two)" and "Picture on the Wall"
Dick Heckstall-Smith – Tenor and soprano saxophones on "Suspicions (Part Two)"
Chris Mercer – Tenor saxophone on "Suspicions (Part Two)"

Additional musicians
Malcolm Poole – Bass guitar
Colin Allen – Drums
John Almond – Flute, saxophone

Production
John Mayall – Producer
Mike Vernon – Producer
Tony Clarke – Producer on "Blues City Shakedown"
Bob Gordon – Photography

Charts
Album

References

Deram Records compilation albums
John Mayall albums
John Mayall & the Bluesbreakers albums
1969 compilation albums
Compilation albums by English artists
Albums produced by Mike Vernon (record producer)
Decca Records compilation albums
Albums produced by John Mayall